The Kansas Lottery 300 is a NASCAR Xfinity Series stock car race that takes place at Kansas Speedway in Kansas City, Kansas.

Noah Gragson is the most recent winner of the event.

Past winners

2003: Final win for Pontiac in the top two divisions of NASCAR.
2004, 2012, 2015, & 2020 I: Races extended due to NASCAR overtime.
2020: July race added due to COVID-19 pandemic; scheduled for 250 miles. Replaced race at Iowa Speedway.
2022: Race was shortened due to rain, stopped after the second stage (official status).

Multiple winners (drivers)

Multiple winners (teams)

Manufacturer wins

References

External links

2001 establishments in Kansas
NASCAR Xfinity Series races
NASCAR races at Kansas Speedway
Recurring sporting events established in 2001
Annual sporting events in the United States